Georgios Drys (Γεώργιος Δρυς) (1944 – 3 June 2021) was a Greek politician who served as a member of parliament from 1989 to 2004 and as  from 2001 to 2004.

References

1944 births
2021 deaths
20th-century Greek physicists
Greek educators
Greek politicians
Agriculture ministers of Greece
Greek MPs 1989 (June–November)
Greek MPs 1989–1990
Greek MPs 1990–1993
Greek MPs 1993–1996
Greek MPs 1996–2000
Greek MPs 2000–2004
MPs of Corfu
PASOK politicians
National and Kapodistrian University of Athens alumni
Alumni of City, University of London
Academic staff of the University of Patras
Politicians from Corfu